Makhmutov is a surname slavicised from the name Mahmud. Notable people with the surname include:

 Marat Makhmutov (born 1975), Russian footballer
 Ruslan Makhmutov (born 1991), Russian footballer

Turkic-language surnames
Russian-language surnames